Johann Sebastian Bach composed the church cantata  (Everything waits for You), 187 in Leipzig for the seventh Sunday after Trinity and first performed it on 4 August 1726.

The text came from a 1704 libretto cycle published in Meiningen, following a symmetrical pattern in seven movements, which opens with a quotation from the Old Testament, is focused on a central quotation from the New Testament, and ends with a closing chorale. Symmetrical recitatives and arias form the other movements. Bach set the opening as a chorus based on two verses from Psalm 104, set the central movement as a bass solo on a quotation from the Sermon on the Mount, and concluded with two stanzas from Hans Vogel's hymn "" in a four-part setting. The arias and recitatives are performed by three vocal soloist. The cantata is scored for a Baroque instrumental ensemble of two oboes, strings and continuo.

Bach later used the music from four movements of this cantata for his Missa in G minor, BWV 235.

History and words 

Bach wrote the cantata in 1726 for the Seventh Sunday after Trinity as part of his third cantata cycle. The prescribed readings for the Sunday are from the Epistle to the Romans, "the wages of sin is death; but the gift of God is eternal life", and from the Gospel of Mark, the feeding of the 4000.

During 1726, Bach had performed several cantatas by his cousin Johann Ludwig Bach who worked in Meiningen, from 2 February (Purification) to 30 May (Ascension). The texts for these cantatas came from a 1704 anonymous libretto cycle published in Meiningen. They follow a symmetrical pattern: structured in seven movements, they begin with a chorus on a quotation from the Old Testament, turn in the central movement to a quotation from the New Testament, and end with a closing chorale, while a librettist added text for the inner movements as recitatives and arias.

Bach began to compose cantatas on texts in this format on the first Sunday after Trinity in 1726, with Brich dem Hungrigen dein Brot, BWV 39. The text for Es wartet alles auf dich follows the same pattern. A possible parallel source is Psalm 145:15-16.

The cantata is closed by stanzas 4 and 6 of Hans Vogel's hymn "" (1563). The poet of the other movements is unknown; Walther Blankenburg suggested Christoph Helm. The librettist paraphrased in the third movement .

Bach first performed the cantata on 4 August 1726. He used the music of four movements, the opening chorus and the arias, for four movements of the Gloria of his Missa in G minor, BWV 235.

Music

Structure and scoring 
Bach structured the cantata in seven movements in two parts, the first three movements to be performed before the sermon, the others after the sermon. The first movement is a choral setting of psalm verses, followed by recitative and aria, the fourth movement is a bass solo on a quotation of Jesus, followed by aria and recitative, and closed by a chorale. Bach scored the work for three vocal soloists (soprano (S), alto (A) and bass (B)), a four-part choir, and a Baroque instrumental ensemble: two oboes (Ob), two violins (Vl), viola (Va), and basso continuo (Bc). The duration of the cantata is around 25 minutes.

In the following table of the movements, the scoring follows the Neue Bach-Ausgabe. The keys and time signatures are taken from the Bach scholar Alfred Dürr, using the symbol for common time (4/4). The instruments are shown separately for winds and strings, while the continuo, playing throughout, is not shown.

Movements

1 
The opening chorus is a setting of psalm verses, "" (These wait all upon You, that you may give them nourishment in due saeson). Grammatically this is a passive form where the subject (God) comes after the verb. This underlines the faith of the writer, who knows (s)he can totally rely on God for his/her daily needs. The following subjunctive (conditional form) underlines that God does this by grace, totally undeserved by the recipient. This is central to Bach's Lutheran faith.

These verses are often used as a prayer before a meal. Bach achieves a unity of form, but at the same time an individual handling of the four ideas of the text, as in a motet. The motifs of the instrumental sinfonia of 28 measures are continued through most of the movement, creating unity. "" (a) is expressed in free polyphony embedded in the instrumental music, then repeated together with "" (b) in free polyphony with canonic imitation on two themes, with the instruments playing mostly colla parte, then a and b are repeated within a part of the sinfonia, which is continued instrumentally. In the following second section, "" (c) is the theme of a choral fugue, "" (d) is the countersubject. The instruments play colla parte first, then add motifs from the sinfonia. In the third concluding section the complete text is repeated within a part of the sinfonia.

2 
In the first recitative, "" (What creatures are contained by the great sphere of the world!), the librettist paraphases ideas from verses 17 to 25 of the same psalm, which praises God as the Creator of the universe.

3 
The alto voice is accompanied by the full orchestra in a dance-rhythm with irregular grouping of measures in the ritornellos.

4 
The fourth and central movement sets the biblical words "" (Therefore, do not be anxious, saying: "What will we eat, what will we drink), from the Sermon on the Mount.

5 
The soprano aria, "" (God takes care of every life), is in two contrasting parts. The first section is accompanied by festive dotted rhythms and a broad melody of the solo oboe, the second section, marked , is again like a dance. Only the instruments repeat afterwards the dotted rhythm of the beginning. 

The dance seems to have an unusual confidence, almost a cheeky or upstart like confidence. It sounds more like a bassoon than an oboe. So God's grace allows the believer this confidence. It reminds me a little of Luther's instruction to his newborn son, who wouldn't be dissuaded from crying endlessly. Finally in desperation, Luther asked him, "Is the devil bothering you again? Why not do what I do and pull your pants down and fire a blast in his face." John Osborne used this scene in his "Luther" play. The incident may well be apocryphal, and my 'quotation' is based on my memory. Were he based in England, Luther may well have been nicknamed "fartin' Martin" (as I like to be). The bassoon/oboe certainly mimics the methanous outburst well. I can't help wondering if Bach had this Lutheran outburst in mind as he wrote.... I guess it should be added, this is about as irreverent as Bach got in his music.

6 

7 
The final chorale is a four-part setting for the choir and all instruments. It features two stanzas of the hymn. The fourth stanza, "" (God has provided for the earth) relates to the beginning, God as the Creator, while the sixth stanza, "" (We thank profoundly and pray to Him that He give us the will of His Spirit, that we understand it rightly), expresses thanksgiving, ending on the Latin word "Gratias".

Publication 
The cantata was published in the first edition of Bach's works by the Bach-Gesellschaft in volume 37, edited by Alfred Dörffel in 1891. In the Neue Bach-Ausgabe, it appeared in volume I/18 in 1966, edited by Leo Treitler, followed by a critical report in 1967.

Recordings 

A list of recordings is provided on the Bach Cantatas Website. Ensembles playing period instruments in historically informed performance are shown with green background.

References

Bibliography 
General
 

Books
 
 

Online sources

External links 
 
 Cantata BWV 187 Es wartet alles auf dich history, scoring, sources for text and music, translations to various languages, discography, discussion, Bach Cantatas Website
 BWV 187 Es wartet alles auf dich English translation, University of Vermont
 BWV 187 Es wartet alles auf dich text, scoring, University of Alberta
 Luke Dahn: BWV 187.7 bach-chorales.com

Church cantatas by Johann Sebastian Bach
Psalm-related compositions by Johann Sebastian Bach
1726 compositions